Events from the year 1910 in the United States.

Incumbents

Federal Government 
 President: William Howard Taft (R-Ohio)
 Vice President: James S. Sherman (R-New York)
 Chief Justice: Melville Fuller (Illinois) (until July 4), Edward Douglass White (Louisiana) (starting December 19)
 Speaker of the House of Representatives: Joseph Gurney Cannon (R-Illinois)
 Congress: 61st

Events

January–March

 January 10–20 – The 1910 Los Angeles International Air Meet at Dominguez Field is held near Los Angeles, California (the first aviation meet to be held in the United States).
 January 10 – Joyce Hall founds Hallmark Cards.
 January 24 - Dyer, Indiana is incorporated.
 February 8 – The Boy Scouts of America youth organization is incorporated by William D. Boyce.
 February 16–18 – The state of Ohio is crippled by a snowstorm.
 March 9 – The 17-month-long Westmoreland County coal strike of 1910–11, which at its peak will involve 15,000 coal miners represented by the United Mine Workers across 65 mines, begins in Westmoreland County, Pennsylvania.
 March 14 – The Lakeview Gusher is vented into the atmosphere.
 March 19 – Republicans reduce the powers of the Speaker of the House of Representatives to influence committee membership.
 March 30 – The Mississippi Legislature founds The University of Southern Mississippi.

April–June
 April 6 – Wildwood Crest, New Jersey is incorporated as a borough of Cape May County, New Jersey.
 May 11 – The U.S. Congress establishes Glacier National Park in Montana.
 May 16 – The U.S. Congress authorizes the creation of the United States Bureau of Mines.
 June 19 – The first unofficial Father's Day is observed.
 June 25
 The Mann Act, known popularly as the "White Slave Traffic Act", is passed by the U.S. Congress, prohibiting the transportation of women across state lines for "immoral purposes".
 The U.S. Parole Commission is created, making it possible for the first time for persons convicted of a federal crime to be paroled before the end of their sentences. Prior to this, a federal prisoner could only secure an early release by commutation or pardon by the President of the U.S.
 The United States Postal Savings System is created by law, adapting, for the U.S. a system that had been used in European nations for people to deposit up to $2,500 into an interest-bearing (2%) account at their local post office. The system will continue in some form until 1985.
 The Pickett Act becomes law, giving the President of the U.S. authority to withdraw government-owned land from public use, as necessary, for government projects.
 The "direct system" of public land surveying begins in the U.S., replacing the system of contracting with private surveyors.

July–September
 July 4 – African-American boxer Jack Johnson defeats white boxer James J. Jeffries in a heavyweight boxing match, sparking race riots across the United States.
 July 22 – A wireless telegraph sent from the S.S. Montrose results in the identification and later arrest and execution of murderer Dr. Hawley Crippen.
 July 24 – James MacGillivray publishes the first account of Paul Bunyan in the Detroit News.

October–December
 October 1 – Los Angeles Times bombing: A bomb explodes at the Los Angeles Times building, leaving 21 dead and several injured; brothers James B. and John Joseph McNamara are later arrested and sentenced.
 October 10 – Tau Epsilon Phi fraternity is founded by ten Jewish men at Columbia University as a response to the existence of similar organizations which would not admit Jewish members.
 October 11 – Theodore Roosevelt becomes the first former president to ride in an airplane.
 November – John Lomax's pioneering collection Cowboy Songs and Other Frontier Ballads is published by Sturgis and Walton with an introduction by Theodore Roosevelt.
 November 4 – Antonio Rodríguez is burned at the stake near Rocksprings, Texas after being arrested a few days earlier for the murder of Mrs. Lem Henderson at her ranch. His murder incites race riots in both Texas and Mexico.
 November 7 – The first air flight for the purpose of delivering commercial freight is made between Dayton and Columbus, both in Ohio, by the Wright Brothers and department store owner Max Moorehouse. Philip Parmalee was the pilot.
 November 17 – Ralph Johnstone, a pilot for the Wright Exhibition Team, dies at Denver, Colorado after his machine breaks apart in mid-air in full view of about 5,000 spectators. Johnstone becomes the first American pilot to die in the crash of an airplane in the United States.
 November 22 – U.S. Senator Aldrich and A.P. Andrews (Assistant Secretary of the Treasury Department), along with many of the country's leading financiers, who together represent about 1/6 of the world's wealth, are witnessed leaving Hoboken, New Jersey on a train together. They later arrive at the Jekyll Island Club to discuss monetary policy and the banking system, an event which some say is the impetus for the creation of the Federal Reserve
 November 26 – Following Japanese annexation of Korea in August, Japanese journalist Kioshi Kawakami publishes propaganda article in November edition of "World Today" attempting to justify Japanese colonization of Korea.   
 December 12 – New York City socialite Dorothy Arnold disappears. Her family does not notify the police until 6 weeks later, after their own investigations fail to produce any results.
 December 19 – Edward Douglass White is sworn in as the 9th Chief Justice of the United States.
 December 31 – Two of America's premier pioneer aviators are killed on this day: John Moisant in New Orleans and Wright pilot Arch Hoxsey in Los Angeles.

Undated
 US census shows that 20.9% of the population classed as "Negro" are of mixed race.
 Henry Ford sells 10,000 cars.
 World Peace Foundation established.

Ongoing
 Progressive Era (1890s–1920s)
 Lochner era (c. 1897–c. 1937)

Births

January–February
 January 6 – Wright Morris, photographer and writer (died 1998)
 January 7 – Orval Faubus, governor of Arkansas (died 1994)
 January 16 – Dizzy Dean, baseball player (died 1974)
 January 21 – Albert Rosellini, politician (died 2011)
 February 3 – Robert Earl Jones, actor (died 2006)
 February 19 – Dorothy Janis, actress (died 2010)
 February 27 – Joan Bennett, actress (died 1990)

March–April
 March 3 – Kittens Reichert, silent movies child actor (died 1990)
 March 9 – Samuel Barber, composer (died 1981)
 March 10 – Albert Facchiano, Italian-American criminal (died 2011)
 March 24 – Clyde Barrow, outlaw (died 1934)
 March 28 – Frederick Baldwin Adams, Jr., librarian (died 2001)
 April 9 – Abraham A. Ribicoff, United States Senator from Connecticut from 1963 till 1981. (died 1998)
 April 10 – Paul Sweezy, economist and editor (died 2004)
 April 16
Eddie Mayo, baseball player (died 2006)
Berton Roueché, medical writer (died 1994)

May–June
 May 3 – Norman Corwin, screenwriter (died 2011)
 May 12 – Charles B. Fulton, jurist (died 1996)
 May 22 – Johnny Olson, game show announcer (died 1985)
 May 23
Scatman Crothers, actor and musician (died 1986)
Artie Shaw, clarinetist and bandleader (died 2004)
 May 28 – T-Bone Walker, singer (died 1976)
 May 30 – Ralph Metcalfe, athlete (died 1978)
 June 3 – Paulette Goddard, actress (died 1990)
 June 8
C. C. Beck, illustrator (died 1989)
John W. Campbell, journalist and author (died 1971)
 June 17 – H. Owen Reed, composer (died 2014)
 June 18 – E. G. Marshall, actor (died 1998)
 June 19 – Paul Flory, chemist, Nobel laureate (died 1985)
 June 23
Peaches Browning, actress (died 1956)
Gordon B. Hinckley, fifteenth president of The Church of Jesus Christ of Latter-day Saints (died 2008)

July–August
 July 4 – Gloria Stuart, actress (died 2010)
 July 14 – William Hanna, animator (died 2001)
 July 22 – Ruthie Tompson, animator (died 2021)
 July 30 – Edgar de Evia, photographer (died 2003)
 August 4
Anita Page, actress (died 2008)
Hedda Sterne, Romanian-born painter and printmaker (died 2011)
 August 12 – Jane Wyatt, actress (died 2006)
 August 15 – Thomas Kuchel, United States Senator from California from 1953 till 1969. (died 1994)
 August 23 – Lonny Frey, baseball player (died 2009)
 August 25 – Dorothea Tanning, artist (died 2012)

September–October
 September 3 – Kitty Carlisle Hart, singer and actress (died 2007)
 September 6 – Walter Giesler, soccer coach (died 1976)
 September 18 – Joseph F. Enright, naval officer (died 2000)
 September 23 – Elliott Roosevelt, author and World War II hero (died 1990)
 September 29 – Virginia Bruce, actress and singer (died 1982)
 October 1 – Bonnie Parker, outlaw (died 1934)
 October 7 – Henry P. McIlhenny, art collector, socialite and philanthropist (died 1986)
 October 8 – Gus Hall, communist leader (died 2000)
 October 10 – Julius Shulman, architectural photographer (died 2009)
 October 12
Bob Sheppard, baseball announcer (died 2010)
Robert Fitzgerald, poet and translator (died 1985)
 October 14 – John Wooden, basketball coach (died 2010)
 October 20 – Bob Sheppard, sportscaster (died 2010)
 October 21 – William Vitarelli, educator and architect (died 2010)
 October 25 – Charles C. Stelle, United States diplomat (died 1964)

November–December
 November 9 – Carroll Quigley, historian, polymath, and theorist of the evolution of civilizations (died 1977)
 November 13 – William Bradford Huie, journalist, editor, publisher and author (died 1986)
 November 17 – Jean Potts, mystery novelist (died 1999)
 December 11 – Mildred Cleghorn, chairwoman of the Fort Sill Apache tribe (died 1997)
 December 15 – John Hammond, record producer (died 1987)
 December 18 – Abe Burrows, playwright (died 1985)
 December 29 – Frank Abbandando, gangster (died 1942)
 December 30 – Paul Bowles, author (died 1999)

Full date unknown 
 Hilda Conkling, child poet (died 1986)

Deaths

January to June  
 January 12 – Bass Reeves, one of the first black Deputy U.S. Marshals west of the Mississippi River (born 1838)
 January 25 – Lotta Faust, Broadway actress (born 1880)
 March 27 – Alexander Emanuel Agassiz, scientist (born 1835)
 March 28 – William Paul Roberts, Confederate brigadier general (born 1841)
 March 29 – Thomas L. Rosser, Confederate major general (born 1836)
 April 12 – William G. Sumner, social scientist, Yale professor (born 1840)
 April 21 – Mark Twain, writer, entrepreneur, publisher and lecturer (born 1835)
 May 3 – Howard T. Ricketts, pathologist (born 1871)
 May 31 – Elizabeth Blackwell, physician (born 1821)
 June 5 – O. Henry, novelist (born 1862)
 June 23 – John McGraw, 2nd Governor of Washington (born 1850)
 June 28 – Samuel D. McEnery, U.S. Senator from Louisiana from 1897 to 1910 (born 1837)

July to September 
 July 5 – Melville Fuller, Chief Justice (born 1833)
 July 31 – John G. Carlisle, U.S. Senator from Kentucky from 1890 to 1893 (born 1834)
 August 10 – Joe Gans, professional boxer, World Lightweight Champion from 1902-1908 (born 1874)
 August 24 – Wilkinson Call, U.S. Senator from Florida from 1879 to 1897 (born 1834)
 August 26 – William James, psychologist and philosopher (born 1842)
 September 5 – Julian Edwards, composer (born 1855)
 September 11 – Isaac L. Ellwood, businessman, rancher and inventor (born 1833) 
 September 18 – Lelia P. Roby, philanthropist; founder, Ladies of the Grand Army of the Republic (born 1848) 
 September 29 – Winslow Homer, painter (born 1836)

October to December 
 October 3 –
Rufus Blodgett, U.S. Senator from New Jersey from 1887 to 1893 (born 1834)
Lucy Hobbs Taylor, dentist and teacher (born 1833)
 October 15 –
 Byron Andrews, journalist, statesman, author and businessman (born 1852)
 Stanley Ketchel, boxer (born 1886)
 October 17 – 
 Julia Ward Howe, abolitionist and poet (born 1819)
 William Vaughn Moody, dramatist and poet (born 1869)
 October 20 – David B. Hill, 29th Governor of New York (born 1843)
 November 17 – Ralph Johnstone, aviator (born 1886)
 November 18 – William A. B. Branch, politician (born 1847)
 November 23 – Hawley Harvey Crippen, murderer, executed in the United Kingdom (born 1862)
 December 3 – Mary Baker Eddy, Christian science founder (born 1821)
 December 31 – in separate aviation accidents
 Archibald Hoxsey, aviator (born 1884)
 John Moisant, aviator (born 1868)

Full date unknown 
 Neil Burgess, comedian (born 1846)
 Mary Jane Richardson Jones, abolitionist (born 1819)

See also
 List of American films of 1910
 Timeline of United States history (1900–1929)

References

External links
 

 
1910s in the United States
United States
United States
Years of the 20th century in the United States